Slåtten (name of church written Slotten, official name Slåtten) is a village in Måsøy Municipality in Troms og Finnmark county, Norway. The village is located along the Revsbotn fjord, along Norwegian County Road 889. Slotten Church is located in this very small village.

References

Villages in Finnmark
Måsøy
Populated places of Arctic Norway